Allan Bromley may refer to:

 D. Allan Bromley (1926–2005), Canadian-American physicist
 Allan G. Bromley (1947–2002), Australian historian of computing

See also
 Allyn Bromley (born 1928), American artist and art educator